Humacao Airport  is a public use airport owned by the Puerto Rico Ports Authority and located  southeast of Humacao, a city in Puerto Rico.

History 
The airport once had domestic airline service from Luis Munoz Marin International Airport in San Juan, on an airline named Dorado Wings.

Facilities 
It has one asphalt paved runway designated 10/28 which measures .

See also 

 Transport in Puerto Rico
 List of airports in Puerto Rico

References

External links 
 
 OpenStreetMap - Humacao Airport
 SkyVector - Dr Hermenegildo Ortiz Quinones Airport

Airports in Puerto Rico
Humacao, Puerto Rico